Yatim (with the meaning "orphan" both in its Malay and Arabic language areas of distribution) is an Indonesian, Malaysian and Arabic family name. Notable people with the surname include:

 Michel Yatim (1920–2006), Syrian Melkite Greek Catholic bishop
 Rais Yatim (born 1942), Malaysian politician
 Sammy Yatim (1994–2013), Canadian of Aramean descent shot by a Toronto Police Service officer

References 

Arabic-language surnames